In chemistry, primene amines are mixtures of long-chain branched primary amines. One member of this class of amine is tert-octylamine, H2NC(CH3)2(CH2)4CH3. These compounds have a faint ammonia-like odor.  The compounds are colorless, although typical commercial samples are yellowish owing to the presence of impurities.  Primene amines are used as used in solvent extractions.

References

Alkylamines
Tert-butyl compounds